The Dean of Niagara is an Anglican dean in the Anglican Diocese of Niagara of the Ecclesiastical Province of Ontario, based at Christ's Church Cathedral in Hamilton, Ontario. The incumbent is also Rector of Christ Church.

The incumbents have been:

Source:

References

Anglican Church of Canada deans
Deans of Niagara
Deans of Niagara